Richard Chichester may refer to:

 Richard Henry Lee Chichester (1870–1930), American judge from Virginia
 Richard Chichester (died 1496) (1423–1496), Sheriff of Devon

See also
 Richard of Chichester (1197–1253), Bishop of Chichester